, also known as The Great Magical Gap, is a Japanese manga series. The story revolves around a young girl named Punie Tanaka who is princess of Magical Land. In order for her to become queen, however, she must become a transfer student in a Japanese high school. Due to her potential to become the next ruler, she has many enemies that wish to assassinate her. This proves difficult to them because Punie is both skilled at martial arts and possesses magic powers which she uses to quickly defeat her enemies. The series is a parody of magical princess anime, and often uses the juxtaposition of cute characters with brutal violence for humor. The anime was released in the U.S. on October 21, 2008 by Media Blasters as a subtitled release and was later released with an English dub as well as the original Japanese dub on June 28, 2011 in a special edition.

Characters

Main characters
 
 
 The protagonist and, according to flashbacks, the antagonist of the story, Punie has come to Japan in order to prove herself worthy of becoming the next Queen of Magical Land. As the princess of Magical Land who is next in line of the throne, she has many enemies whom she defeats with her submission maneuvers and magic powers. Punie may seem young and innocent, but when threatened (and she feels threatened very easily) she quickly becomes violent and aggressive. She maintains the image of a cute and carefree girl on the front, hiding her true nature as a ruthless witch who has no second thoughts killing people, unicorns and vegetables or to make use of her friends to achieve her aim. Her incantation is 'Lyrical Tokarev, Kill Them All'. Punie is an expert on applying submission holds, believing in this particular branch of infighting technique as the 'true way of the royalty'. She prefaces the name of her submission maneuvers with "Princess" such as the "Princess Head Lock" or "Princess Figure Four Leg Lock". Her name is a pun on Kunie Tanaka, a famous actor (not an actress). It is also revealed in her battle with Elise that she can freely dislocate her shoulders as and when required.
 
 
 Punie's companion from Waku-Waku Mascot Village, Paya-tan is a dog-like creature with a single horn, and two distinct personalities. He became Punie's mascot after she defeated him in unarmed combat with her Princess Head Lock, although not before warning Punie that he will grab any opportunity to make attempts on her life, which she confidently agreed. While assisting Punie, he behaves cutely and speaks in a high-pitched voice. At other times, he attempts to assassinate Punie and behaves in a more adult fashion, speaking in a deep voice and smoking a cigarette. Paya-tan served as an army colonel during the Vietnam War and it has also been implied that he had fought in Russia as well. He also is extremely flexible and can rotate his arms and legs in a 360 motion.
 
 
 Tetsuko is Punie's classmate and best friend. An avid Railfan, she is also the president of the school's Railway Research Club. Despite being one of the regulars on the receiving end of Punie's insidious plans - usually as a sacrificial lamb for traps laid by her enemies, she appears to be innocently oblivious of the true nature of Punie's character. Her name comes from Kokutetsu (Japanese National Railways), followed by -ko, a typical suffix for girl's name. As such, her actions are often identified with imagery of trains, which appear in the form of montages.
 
 
 Anego is Punie's classmate and rival. She leads a girl gang that tries to maintain their power in the school while causing general mayhem. She later befriends Punie and Tetsuko, although she is always suspicious and wary of Punie's evil intentions throughout the series. Despite her rugged appearance, Anego exhibits the qualities of a tsundere character in one episode when she develops a crush on a medic in her school. Ultimately Anego reverts to her old character after Punie put her through a harrowing first date with the medic.

Supporting characters
 
 
 Punie's Mother and queen of Magical Land. She was responsible for the coup which eliminated the previous rulers and gave herself political power. Her incantation, as revealed in the anime OAV's fourth omake, is "Lyrical Tokarev, Nobody, No Cry".
 
 
 Punie's Father. He is the submissive one in the relationship and is deeply concerned for his daughter's well-being. During the anime OAV series and the omake, Esmeralda often makes use of him as furniture by sitting on him.
 
 
 
 
 Punie's little sisters who sneak to Japan in order to assassinate her. They possess the "Ring of Immortal", a magical heirloom which they use in order to summon a spirit to destroy Punie. They activate this artifact with the incantation "Lyrical Tokarev, Destroy All Evil". Whether or not this is their own personal incantation or the activation incantation for the Ring of Immoral is left to conjecture. When executing combination attacks, they preface their attack names with "Gemini" such as the "Gemini Knee Drop" and the "Gemini Low Kick".
 
 
 The daughter of the previous king of Magical Land, Elise seeks to exact revenge against Punie for stealing her place as the next-in-line for the throne after Punie's mother Esmeralda's coup. She digs large diameter holes in the ground as traps, resulting in a nickname of "Hole Digger Elise" from Punie to her displeasure. She appears in episode 3 of the OVA making a direct challenge to Punie. Despite Elise's apparent advantage against Punie in unarmed combat in the early stages of their face-off, she eventually succumbs and is subsequently tortured with as many as 7 different kinds of submission holds and locks off-camera before Tetsuko and Anego. After the initial encounter, Elise becomes Punie's classmate, and sits behind Tetsuko.
 
 
 A strict and sadistic teacher who loves catching and torturing those who cheat on her tests. She will not change her way too serious attitude about passing tests fair and square even if there is war going on in her class at the moment. She comes to substitute Punie and Anego's homeroom teacher on an important math test.

OVA episodes

External links
  
 

2002 manga
2006 anime OVAs
Dark comedy anime and manga
Diomedéa
Kadokawa Shoten manga
Kadokawa Dwango franchises
Shōnen manga
Magical girl anime and manga